"Nissa la Bella" (Nice the Beautiful) is the unofficial anthem of the city of Nice, France. It is written in Niçard, a dialect of Ligurian that is the original language of the city. It was written by Menica Rondelly in 1903, first under the title of A la mieu bella Nissa; the song takes its actual name in 1906, after some arrangements.

Text

References

External links 
 Audio versions of this song
 Score, MIDI file and lyrics

French anthems
Nice